Raghav Lal Baidya (Nepali:राघबलाल बैद्य) is the Attorney General of Nepal. He was previously a judge in the Janakpur Appellate Court. Baidya was appointed to Attorney General on August 21, 2008, by President Ram Baran Yadav upon the recommendation by Prime Minister Pushpa Kamal Dahal.

References

20th-century Nepalese judges
Living people
Year of birth missing (living people)
Place of birth missing (living people)
21st-century Nepalese judges
Attorneys general